Brett Josef Grubisic (born 1963) is a Canadian author, editor, and sessional lecturer of English at the University of British Columbia.

Education 
He obtained his bachelors and masters degrees from the University of Victoria (B.A., M.A.) and completed his PH.D. from the University of British Columbia.

Career 
Grubisic has edited the anthology of gay male pulp fiction, which is a collection of stories that represent lives outside the urban middle-class mainstream. He has also co-edited an anthology of upcoming Canadian writers featuring acclaimed writers such as Annabel Lyon, Steven Heighton, Camilla Gibb, Michael Turner, and Larissa Lai. This anthology aims to redress an absence which the editors claim to have noticed in Canadian literature: sexually frank fiction.

Grubisic's debut novel, The Age of Cities, was published in 2006  and was a finalist for the City of Vancouver Book Award. Set predominantly in the late 1950s, the novel-within-a-novel traces the uncertain evolution of a librarian as he struggles between two disparate choices, one urban and the other rural. Grubisic's follow-up novel, This Location of Unknown Possibilities, appeared in 2014. Satirising university campus and film production politics, it recounts the comic but transformative experience of two anti-heroic protagonists, Marta Spëk, an English professor, and Jakob Nugent, a film production manager, as they travel from Vancouver to British Columbia's Okanagan Valley to work on a television biopic about Lady Hester Stanhope. Understanding Beryl Bainbridge, Grubisic's comprehensive study of the British author's fiction, was published in 2008; it examines Bainbridge as a blackly comic novelist as well as a writer of historiographic metafiction.

He has written about films, books, and writers for the Toronto Star, Literary Review of Canada, National Post, the Vancouver Sun, The Globe and Mail, Maclean's, and Xtra!.

In 2015, he also served as a judge for the Dayne Ogilvie Prize, selecting Alex Leslie as that year's winner.

Bibliography

Non-fiction
Understanding Beryl Bainbridge (University of South Carolina Press, 2008)
American Hunks: The Muscular Male Body in Popular Culture, 1860-1970 (Arsenal Pulp, 2009)
National Plots: Historical Fiction and Changing Ideas of Canada (Wilfrid Laurier University Press, 2010)
Blast, Corrupt, Dismantle, Erase: Contemporary North American Dystopian Literature (Wilfrid Laurier University Press, 2014)

Fiction
 The Age of Cities (Arsenal Pulp Press, 2006)
 This Location of Unknown Possibilities (Now or Never Press, 2014)
 From Up River and For One Night Only (Now or Never Press, 2016)
 Oldness; Or, the Last-Ditch Efforts of Marcus O (Now or Never Press, 2018)
 My Two-Faced Luck (2021)

Anthologies
 Contra/Diction: New Gay Male Fiction. (Arsenal Pulp, 1998)
 Carnal Nation: Brave New Sex Fictions (Arsenal Pulp, 2000), edited with Carellin Brooks

References

External links
The Age of Cities

1963 births
Canadian male novelists
21st-century Canadian novelists
Canadian gay writers
Writers from Vancouver
Academic staff of the University of British Columbia
Living people
Canadian LGBT novelists
Canadian anthologists
21st-century Canadian male writers
21st-century Canadian LGBT people
Gay novelists